The 1972 Oakland Raiders season was the team's 13th season. The Raiders won the AFC West for the second time in three seasons. They lost in the AFC Division Round to the Pittsburgh Steelers when Franco Harris scored the game-winning touchdown on the Immaculate Reception. The Raiders still dispute that this was an illegal touchdown to this day.

This would be the only season that the Raiders made the playoffs between 1967 and 1977 that the Raiders failed to advance to the AFL or AFC Championship Game.

Offseason

NFL Draft

Roster

Regular season

Schedule

Game summaries

Week 1

Week 2

Week 3

Week 4

Week 5

Week 6

Week 7

Week 8

Week 9

Week 10

Week 11

Week 12

Week 13

Week 14

Standings

Playoffs

Game summaries

Awards and honors

References 

 Raiders on Pro Football Reference
 Raiders on Database Football

AFC West championship seasons
Oakland
Oakland Raiders seasons
Oakland